Oslo Package 3 is a political agreement and plan for investments of  in Oslo and Akershus, Norway. It involves financing for road and public transport infrastructure, as well as operating subsidies to public transport in the period 2008–27. It will be part of the National Transport Plan 2010–19. In addition to state grant, the main financing will be through toll ring around Oslo. The plan is a follow-up on its predecessors, the Oslo Package 1 and Oslo Package 2.

Public transport projects
 Upgrade of the Common Tunnel of the Oslo Metro
 New Homansbyen Station on the metro
 Building of Hasle Line and Løren Station on the metro
 189 new MX3000 electric multiple units for the metro
 Extension of the Furuset Line to Akershus University Hospital
 Extension of the Ekeberg Line to Hauketo

Highway projects
 Norwegian National Road 168 Røa Tunnel
 Norwegian National Road 4 Bjørvika–Økern
 Norwegian National Road 4, Fossum Diagonal
 Norwegian National Road 150 Nydal Junction
 European Route E18, Asker–Skøyen
 European Route E6, Manglerud Tunnel
 European Route E18, Mossevei Tunnel

Environmental impact
Although Oslo Package 3 has been presented as an environmental project that will save the public transport in the Oslo area, doubt has been raised as to the actual impact of the project. In a report ordered by the Norwegian Society of Chartered Scientific and Academic Professionals by the consulting company Civitas that the emission of greenhouse gases will increase with 50% in the period 1991–2025 with Oslo Package 3, despite the Oslo City Council having voted to reduce emissions with 50% from 1990-level by 2030.

References

External links
Oslo Package 3 in NTP 
Aftenposten Aften on Oslo Package 3 
Norwegian Public Roads Administration page on Oslo Package 3 
Norwegian Public Roads Administration main report on Oslo Package 3, October 2006 

Transport in Oslo
Transport in Akershus